Agios Stefanos or Hagios Stephanos is Greek for Saint Stephen. It may refer to:

Places in Greece
Agios Stefanos, Saravali, a village in the municipality of Patras near close to Saravali
Agios Stefanos, Achaea, a village in the municipality of West Achaea, also known as Peristera (Olenia)
Agios Stefanos, Attica, a suburb of Athens
Agios Stefanos, Crete, a village in the municipality Ierapetra
Agios Stefanos, Laconia
Agios Stefanos, Mykonos, a beach on the island Mykonos
Agios Stefanos, Phthiotis
Agios Stefanos, Thinali, a village in the municipal unit of Thinali, North-East Corfu
Agios Stefanos Avliotes, a beach/village in the municipal unit of Esperies, North-West Corfu

Other places
The Greek name for Yeşilköy, a neighbourhood of Istanbul, Turkey